Following is a list of persons who have served as justices of the Kentucky Supreme Court in its various forms since 1792.

1792–1895

1895 reorganization 

 *Continued as Justice of the Supreme Court.

1975 reorganization

References

Kentucky
Justices